Thomas Bogan (18 May 1920 – 23 September 1993) was a Scottish footballer, who played as a forward for several clubs in both Scotland and England. Born in Glasgow, Bogan played for Strathclyde, Blantyre Celtic, Renfrew and Hibernian before moving to Celtic after the end of the Second World War.

After two-and-a-half years with Celtic, Bogan moved to England to play for Preston North End in September 1948. He played for Preston for one season, before moving to Manchester United in September 1949. However, it was apparent that Bogan had not adapted to the English game and moved back to Scotland to play for Aberdeen in March 1951. A move back to England soon followed, with Bogan moving to Southampton after just four appearances for Aberdeen. Again, though, he struggled to fit in and he moved to Blackburn Rovers and then Macclesfield Town before retiring from professional football.

References

Sources
London Hearts profile
Profile at StretfordEnd.co.uk
Profile at MUFCInfo.com

1920 births
1993 deaths
Footballers from Glasgow
Scottish footballers
Hibernian F.C. players
Celtic F.C. players
Preston North End F.C. players
Manchester United F.C. players
Aberdeen F.C. players
Southampton F.C. players
Blackburn Rovers F.C. players
Macclesfield Town F.C. players
Association football wingers
Scottish Football League players
English Football League players
Scottish Football League representative players
Renfrew F.C. players
Scotland wartime international footballers
Scottish Junior Football Association players
Blantyre Celtic F.C. players
Strathclyde F.C. players